Un Certain Malaise is a live album by guitarist Marc Ducret which was recorded in 1997 and released on Tim Berne's Screwgun label.

Reception
The AllMusic review by Thom Jurek said "For fans of solo guitar recordings, Ducret's experiments and compositions are more than dexterous or fascinating -- they are downright musically edifying".

Track listing
All compositions by Marc Ducret except as indicated
 "What Did I Forget? / Old Brown Shoe" (Ducret / George Harrison) - 9:28  
 "(Détail)" - 12:47  
 "Méfiance" - 5:48  
 "Un Certain Malaise" - 12:15  
 "Le Bruit Court" - 3:13  
 "La Mazurka" - 4:35

Personnel
Marc Ducret - electric guitar

References 

1998 live albums
Marc Ducret live albums
Screwgun Records live albums